The Sejong–Pocheon Expressway (Korean: 세종포천고속도로; Sejong Pocheon Gosok Doro), is an expressway in South Korea, connecting Anseong to Guri, Seoul, Namyangju, Uijeongbu and Pocheon.

Construction on the Guri–Pocheon section was started on June 30, 2012, and finished on June 30, 2017. It is a private investment project so the toll rates are cheaper than other expressways in South Korea. The highway operated is by the Seoul Northern Highway Corporation.The Sejong–Guri section has been called Sejong–Seoul Expressway or 2nd Gyeongbu Expressway, and it is planned to reduce traffic congestion between Gyeongbu Expressway and Jungbu Expressway. The first section of Seongnam–Guri is Anseong–Guri section, was finished on April 25, 2017. The remaining sections between Anseong and Seongnam will be completed in 2022. The second section, Sejong–Anseong, will be started in 2020 and completed in 2025.

Currently the National Route 43, National Route 47 and Dongbu Expressway, which connects Pocheon and Seoul have many vehicles and traffic lights. This expressway has reduced the travel time between two cities from 1 hour 30 minutes to 40 minutes.

Main stopovers

 Gyeonggi Province
 Anseong - Yongin - Gwangju - Seongnam - Hanam
 Seoul
 Gangdong District
 Gyeonggi Province
 Guri
 Seoul
 Jungnang District
 Gyeonggi Province
 Guri - Namyangju - Uijeongbu - Pocheon

Compositions

Lanes 
 S.Guri IC - Soheul JCT: 6 (30.46 km)
 Soheul JCT - Sinbuk IC: 4 (14.14 km)
 Soheul JCT - Yangju IC: 4 (5.94 km)

Tunnel

List of facilities

IC: Interchange, JCT: Junction, SA: Service Area, TG:Tollgate

Guri ~ Pocheon

Soheul ~ Yangju section 
This section is officially opened as the branch line of Sejong–Pocheon Expressway. However, it is guided to the Capital Region 2nd Ring Expressway.

See also 
 Roads and expressways in South Korea
 Transportation in South Korea

References

External links 
 MOLIT South Korean Government Transport Department

Expressways in South Korea
Gyeonggi Province
Transport in Seoul
Roads in Gyeonggi
Roads in Seoul